Om du vill is a studio album by the Swedish dansband Larz-Kristerz, released on 9 November 2009. For the album, the band was awarded a Grammis award in the "Dansband of the year" category and a Guldklaven Award in the "Album of the Year" category.

Track listing
 "The Look"
 "Monte Carlo"
 "Förr eller senare"
 "Half a Boy & Half a Man"
 "Man får leva som man lär"
 "You Don't Have to Say You Love Me"
 "Jackson" (duet with Caroline Borg)
 "Om du vill"
 "It's Only Rock 'n Roll"
 "Du e flickan för mig (The Most Beautiful Girl)"
 "Elenore"
 "Tårar med smaken av salt"
 "I Can't Stop Loving You"

Charts

References 

2009 albums
Larz-Kristerz albums
Swedish-language albums